Baskama is the place where Jonathan, Hasmonean leader of the Jewish people in the second century BC, was murdered by Diodotus Tryphon according to .

The New American Bible Revised Edition suggests that it may lie northeast of the Sea of Galilee. Jewish historian Uriel Rappaport says that it was "probably in the Golan" i.e. the Golan region, "but identification is uncertain". A note in the Encyclopedia of the Bible states that "it is referred to as Basca by Josephus in his Antiquities, xiii. 6. 6. It is possibly to be identified with modern el-Jummeizeh, NE of the Sea of Galilee".

References

Biblical places